Marianna Bottini née Motroni-Andreozzi (7 November 1802 – 25 January 1858) was an Italian composer and harp teacher. She was born in Lucca, daughter of the nobleman Sebastiano Motroni-Andreozzi and his wife Eleonora Flekestein.

She studied counterpoint with Domenico Quilici and was admitted to the Accademia Filarmonica in Bologna in 1820 as an 'honorary master composer'. In 1823 she married the Marquis Lorenzo Bottini, a prominent political figure. She was one of the few women whose music was played for the traditional festival in honor of St. Cecilia. She died in Lucca. Bottini's unperformed opera Elena e Gerardo will receive its world premiere in 2023

Works
Bottini composed most of her works between the ages of 13–20, including music for salons and sacred works. Selected compositions include:
Elena and Gerardo, unperformed opera, 1822
In sacred hymns for three voices, wind instruments, basso continuo, 1819
Briseis (C. Moscheni) cantata for 3 voices, chorus, orchestra, 1820
Cantiamo Pastori cantata for 5 voices, orchestra
Motet for one voice, orchestra, 1818
Qui Tollis for one voice, chorus, orchestra, 1818
Messa da Requiem for 4 voices, orchestra, 1819
Motet for one voice, orchestra, 1819
Quoniam for Bass and orchestra, 1819
Qui Tollis for Bass and orchestra, 1819
Stabat Mater for 3 voices, 1819
Te Deum for 3 voices, 1819
Stabat Mater for voices 3, 1820
Mass for Saint Cecilia for 4 voices, orchestra, 1822
Motet for Saint Cecilia for one voice, orchestra, 1822
Mag for 4 voices, orchestra, after 1823
Miserere for 3 voices, basso continuo, 1824
Crucifixus for 2 voices, continuo
Dixit Dominus for 5 voices, orchestra
Domino ad adjuvandum for 4 voices, orchestra
Symphonie for orchestra, 1818
Symphonie for wind band, 1819
Clarinet concerto
Piano concerto "Concertone", 1822
Quartet for harp, piano, clarinet and horn

References

External links
Messa da Requiem by Marianna Bottini from YouTube

Italian women classical composers
1802 births
1858 deaths
Italian music educators
Italian classical composers
Musicians from Lucca
19th-century classical composers
19th-century Italian composers
19th-century Italian women
Women music educators
19th-century women composers